Udit Narayan Post Graduate College is a college at Padrauna town in Kushinagar district of Uttar Pradesh. College was established in 1962 and is managed by the trust named Udit Narayan Kshetriya School Society. Academically, it is affiliated with Deen Dayal Upadhyay Gorakhpur University and offers various Undergraduate and Post-graduate courses.

References

Postgraduate colleges in Uttar Pradesh
Padrauna